March's Child (Italian:Nata di marzo) is a 1958 Italian comedy film. It stars actor Gabriele Ferzetti.

Partial cast
 Gabriele Ferzetti: Sandro
 Jacqueline Sassard: Francesca
 Mario Valdemarin: Carlo
 Tina De Mola: Nella
 Ester Carloni: Grandmom 
 Franca Mazzoni: Francesca's mother
 Edda Ferronao: Venetian maid 
 Dario Fo (cameo)

References

External links

1958 films
1950s Italian-language films
Films set in Milan
Films directed by Antonio Pietrangeli
Italian comedy films
1958 comedy films
1950s Italian films